Maurice Fournier (born 18 January 1933) is a French former high jumper who competed in the 1956 Summer Olympics and in the 1960 Summer Olympics.

References

External links
 

1933 births
Possibly living people
French male high jumpers
Olympic athletes of France
Athletes (track and field) at the 1956 Summer Olympics
Athletes (track and field) at the 1960 Summer Olympics
Mediterranean Games gold medalists for France
Mediterranean Games medalists in athletics
Athletes (track and field) at the 1955 Mediterranean Games
Athletes (track and field) at the 1959 Mediterranean Games
20th-century French people